Direct to Disc is the second studio album by Australian jazz-fusion band Crossfire released on the Trafalgar Records label and distributed by Warner Music in 1978. It was recorded using the direct to disc recording method, hence the title of the record.

Track listing
 It Coitainly Was
 On the Wings of Albatrocity
 Fahannokookin'
 Oddball
 Satie-ated

Personnel
Jim Kelly (guitars)
Mick Kenny (Wurlitzer piano, fluegelhorn)
Ian Bloxsom (percussion)
Don Reid (saxophones, flute)
Greg Lyon (bass)
Doug Gallacher (drums)

References

1978 albums
Warner Music Group albums
Crossfire (band) albums